Asia Major is an annual peer-reviewed academic journal that focuses on the history of China. From 1923 to 1933 it was based in Germany, from 1949 to 1975 in Great Britain, from 1988 to 1997 in the U.S., and since 1998 in Taiwan.

The journal was originally established in the early 1920s in Leipzig by Jewish-German Sinologist Bruno Schindler (1882–1964), but the original series ended in 1933 when he was forced to flee Germany. In 1949, he revived it in Great Britain where he emigrated to. It was edited by Walter Simon in the years 1964–75. The latest series (Third Series) was revived by Denis Twitchett at Princeton University in 1975, and in 1998 it moved to Taiwan's Academia Sinica with the support of Tu Cheng-sheng.

References

External links

Publications established in 1923
Asian history journals
Chinese studies journals
English-language journals
Annual journals
1923 establishments in Germany